Anna Pernilla Ribeiro Novais ( Andersson; born 3 December 1971) is a Swedish stunt performer and former judoka. She won silver at the 2000 European Judo Championships, and competed in the women's olympic lightweight event in Sydney later the same year, and has also won several Swedish Champion titles.

References

External links
 

1971 births
Sportspeople from Umeå
Living people
Women stunt performers
Swedish female judoka
Olympic judoka of Sweden
Judoka at the 2000 Summer Olympics
20th-century Swedish women